Anastasiya Batuyeva (born 1987) is a handball player from Kazakhstan. She has played on the Kazakhstan women's national handball team, and participated at the 2011 World Women's Handball Championship in Brazil.

References

1987 births
Living people
Kazakhstani female handball players
Asian Games medalists in handball
Handball players at the 2006 Asian Games
Asian Games silver medalists for Kazakhstan
Medalists at the 2006 Asian Games
20th-century Kazakhstani women
21st-century Kazakhstani women